Rancho Entre Napa was a  Mexican land grant in present-day Napa County, California given in 1836 by Governor Mariano Chico to Nicholas Higuera.  The grant extended along the west bank of the Napa River from present-day Napa south to Carneros Creek.

History
Nicholas Higuera was a soldier in San Francisco from 1819–1823, and alcalde at Sonoma.  Higuera married Marta Frias.  Higuera was granted the one square league Rancho Entre Napa, and the  Rancho Rincon de los Carneros.

Unlike most Mexican land grants in California that remained intact at the end of the Mexican era, Rancho Entre Napa was subdivided.  Higuera subdivided and sold much of the land in 1847, retaining  for himself.   With the cession of California to the United States following the Mexican-American War, the 1848 Treaty of Guadalupe Hidalgo provided that the land grants would be honored.  As required by the Land Act of 1851,  16 claims were  filed with the Public Land Commission in 1852 for 14  tracts (Land Cases 80 ND, 108 ND, 113 ND, 152 ND, 160 ND, 171 ND, 172 ND, 176 ND, 177 ND, 231 ND, 242 ND, 244 ND, 260 ND, and 365 ND) of Rancho Entre Napa and 2 tracts (Land Cases 282 ND and 296 ND) of Rancho Rincon de los Carneos.

Nathan Coombs (1826–1877) arrived in the Napa Valley in 1845, and bought a small piece of Rancho Tulucay on the east side of the Napa River from Juarez Cayetano. Coombs purchased  of Rancho Napa on the east side of the Napa River from Salvador Vallejo in 1847.  Coombs purchased  of Rancho Entre Napa from Nicholas Higuera in 1847, and founded and laid out the town of Napa on Rancho Entre Napa in 1848.

See also

List of Ranchos of California

References

Entre Napa
Entre Napa
Napa Valley
Napa, California
Entre